Cabled Linear Traction is the first full-length album by English band Hood.  The LP version was released on Fluff Records in 1994, limited to 200 copies and on Slumberland Records in 1995, limited to 1100 copies.  The CD version was released on Slumberland Records in 1999.

Track listing

References

External links 
Hood Homepage
Slumberland Records

1994 albums
Hood (band) albums